Duncan Evans (born January 1959 in Crewe, Cheshire, England) is a Welsh amateur golfer who won The Amateur Championship at the Royal Porthcawl Golf Club in 1980. Evans was the first Welshman to win the championship and that year his achievement was recognised when he was made BBC Wales Sports Personality of the Year.

Golfing career
In 1980, Evans became the first person from Wales to win the Amateur Championship, which was played in heavy rain at the Royal Porthcawl Golf Club.

Evans represented Great Britain and Ireland in the 1981 Walker Cup at Cypress Point Club in California. He played in three matches; winning one, losing one with one halved. He played in two Open Championships, the 1980 at Muirfield and the 1981 at Royal St George's. Evans missed the halfway cut in 1980 and the third round cut in 1981.

Personal history
In 2009, Evans was imprisoned for four years for his involvement in a £3.5 million Value Added Tax scam.

Team appearances
Amateur
St Andrews Trophy (representing Great Britain and Ireland): 1980 (winners)
European Amateur Team Championship (representing Wales): 1981
Walker Cup (representing Great Britain & Ireland): 1981

References

Welsh male golfers
Amateur golfers
Sportspeople from St Asaph
1959 births
Living people